Warren Bank is a  biological Site of Special Scientific Interest south-east of Wallingford in Oxfordshire. It is managed by the Berkshire, Buckinghamshire and Oxfordshire Wildlife Trust.

This steeply sloping site has unimproved chalk grassland and scrub. There is a rich variety of flora, including horseshoe vetch, chalk milkwort and bee orchid. There are also many insects, with butterflies such as dark green fritillary and green hairstreak.

References

 

Berkshire, Buckinghamshire and Oxfordshire Wildlife Trust
Sites of Special Scientific Interest in Oxfordshire